"Grateful" is a song performed by British singer Rita Ora, taken from the Beyond the Lights soundtrack. It was written by Diane Warren.

Billboard premiered the song's audio on 22 October 2014, from Relativity Music Group's official SoundCloud. The song was released on 11 November 2014 on iTunes as a part of Beyond the Lights soundtrack. Ora performed "Grateful" at the 87th Academy Awards on 22 February 2015.

Awards and nominations

References

External links 

2014 songs
Rita Ora songs
Songs written by Diane Warren